Hitchhike means to go hitchhiking.

Hitchhike or Hitch-Hike may also refer to:

Dance and music
 Hitch hike (dance), a dance move
 "Hitch Hike" (song), a 1963 song by Marvin Gaye
 Hitchhike Records, a record label based in Honolulu, Hawaii

Film
 Hitch-Hike (film), a 1977 Italian crime film
 Hitchhike!, a 1974 made-for-TV movie starring Cloris Leachman
Hitch Hike, a 2012 New Zealand short film by filmmaker Matthew J. Saville

See also
 Hitchhiker (disambiguation)
 The Hitcher (disambiguation)